Andrew Edwards, known as Andy Edwards (born 1964) is a British sculptor.

His notable works include:
The Fine Lady (2005) in Banbury, created working with Julian Jeffery and Carl Payne as ArtCycle and with equestrian sculptor Denise Dutton
 A statue of Brian Clough and Peter Taylor (2010) at Pride Park, the ground of Derby County F.C.
All Together Now (2014) commemorating the 1914 Christmas truce of World War I; a resin cast was displayed in Liverpool in 2014 for the centenary of the truce and a quarter sized version cast in bronze for St George's Park National Football Centre, and there are plans to erect full sized bronzes in Mesen (the Belgian town nearest the site of the truce), Germany and Britain. 
Statue of Frederick Douglass (2014) at College Park, Maryland
Statue of The Beatles (2015) on the Pier Head, Liverpool
Buzzard (2016), Honey Bee (2016) and Hare (2018) in Newcastle-under-Lyme
Statue of the Bee Gees (2021) in Douglas, Isle of Man
Statue of Bob Marley (2021) in Liverpool
Statue of Sir Alex Ferguson at Pittodrie Stadium, Aberdeen (2022)

References

External links

Company website 
Blog 

1964 births
Living people
British sculptors